The Battle of Petrograd was a campaign by the White movement to take the city of Petrograd. The city held significant value, notably as it was the same city that the October Revolution took place in. The battle was also at a critical point in the Civil War as the Whites has also been getting closer to Moscow and the Russian State was at its peak.

Using the new Regional Government of Northwest Russia as a base, the newly formed Northwestern Army had launched an attack from Pskov and drove north to Petrograd. The army saw a string of victories on the road to Petrograd. After cutting a railroad junction from Moscow to Petrograd, the Bolsheviks the city might fall to the Whites. Trotsky went north to rally a defense for the city and used another junction to get supplies from Moscow and help fend off the attack.

Soon the Whites were back in retreat to Estonia. Wanting to secure a peace deal with Soviet Russia, the government refused to allow the Northwestern Army to be restationed in the nation. The Northwestern Army was soon allowed to send pockets of units in while the new government and soon army was disbanded ending any chance of taking Petrograd.

Background
On August 8, the Bolsheviks promised that Estonian independence would be recognized on the condition that the Estonian Army would withdraw from Pskov. Yudenich suggested that the Estonian Army be put under his command in exchange for recognized and secured independence. If the Estonians took the peace deal with the Russian SFSR, the Northwestern Army would have no base for operations. In an effort to preserve an alliance with Estonia, he formed the Regional Government of Northwest Russia to start formal negotiations.

White offensive
On September 28 the Northwestern Army launched the offensive. Within the week Luga had been taken, railroads from Pskov to Petrograd had been cut off and Iamburg had been taken by October 11. On October 20 some units had made it to Pulkovo Heights, within the suburbs of Petrograd. The 3rd Infantry Division of the Army had ignored orders to cut the Moscow-Petrograd railway at Tosno to reach Petrograd first.

Red counteroffensive
Trotsky had traveled north to the city in an effort to rally a defense. The railway junction at Tosno, that was left alone, had allowed supplies to be sent to the defenders of Petrograd from Moscow. On October 21 the Red Army attacked pushing the Whites back from Pulkovo and retook Tsarskoe Selo and Pavlovsk 2 days later. Soon the 7th Army attacked east while the 15th Army attacked south taking back Luga on the 31st. On the second anniversary of the October Revolution the two armies linked up east and south of Iamburg.

Aftermath
After the counterattacks by the 7th and 15th Red Armies, the Northwestern Army was severely weakened. Estonia, who did not want to jeopardize the current peace negotiations, refused to take the White Army in as refugees preventing them from taking shelter in Narva. After several pleas, the
Estonian government agreed to take in small groups, provided that they would be unarmed and would not be wearing the uniform of Northwestern Army. The Regional Government of Northwest Russia was disbanded on December 5 and the army itself formally disbanded.

Notes

References 
 Lincoln, William (1989). A History of the Russian Civil War. Simon and Schuster Publishing.

See also 
 Red Army
 White Army
 Estonian War of Independence

Petrograd
1910s in Russia
Petrograd